, also known by its English title Monkey, is a Japanese television drama based on the 16th-century Chinese novel Journey to the West by Wu Cheng'en.

Plot summary
, the title character, is described in the theme song as being "born from an egg on a mountain top", a stone egg, and thus he is a stone monkey, a skilled fighter who becomes a brash king of a monkey tribe, who, the song goes on to claim, was "the punkiest monkey that ever popped". He achieved a little enlightenment, and proclaimed himself "Great Sage, Equal of Heaven". After demanding the "gift" of a magical staff from a powerful dragon king, and to quiet the din of his rough antics on Earth, Monkey is approached by Heaven to join their host, first in the lowly position of Master of the Stable (manure disposal), and then—after his riotous complaints—as "Keeper of the Peach Garden of Immortality".

Monkey eats many of the peaches, which have taken millennia to ripen, becomes immortal and runs amok. Having earned the ire of Heaven and being beaten in a challenge by an omniscient, mighty, but benevolent, cloud-dwelling , Monkey is imprisoned for 500 years under a mountain in order to learn patience.

A dragon, who was set free by Guanyin after being sentenced to death, eats Tripitaka's horse. On discovering that the horse was tasked with carrying Tripitaka, it assumes the horse's shape to carry the monk on his journey. Later in the story he occasionally assumes human form to assist his new master, although he is still always referred to as "Horse".

Monkey can also change form, for instance into a hornet. In Episode 3, The Great Journey Begins, Monkey transforms into a girl to trick Pigsy. Monkey's other magic powers include: summoning a cloud upon which he can fly; his use of the magic wishing staff which he can shrink and grow at will and from time to time, when shrunk, store in his ear, and which he uses as a weapon; and the ability to conjure monkey warriors by blowing on hairs plucked from his chest.

Monkey, Sandy, and Pigsy are often called upon to battle demons, monsters, and bandits, despite Tripitaka's constant call for peace. Many episodes also feature some moral lesson, usually based upon Buddhist and/or Taoist philosophies, which are elucidated by the narrator at the end of various scenes.

Cast and characters

Broadcast history
Two 26-episode seasons ran in Japan: the first season ran from October 1978 to April 1979, and the second one from November 1979 to May 1980, with screenwriters including Mamoru Sasaki, Isao Okishima, Tetsurō Abe, Kei Tasaka, James Miki, Motomu Furuta, Hiroichi Fuse, Yū Tagami, and Fumio Ishimori.

Saiyūki was dubbed into English from 1979, with dialogue written by David Weir. The dubbed version was broadcast under the name Monkey and broadcast in the United Kingdom by the British Broadcasting Corporation, in New Zealand by Television New Zealand and in Australia by the Australian Broadcasting Corporation. Only 39 of the original 52 episodes were originally dubbed and broadcast by the BBC: all 26 of series 1 and 13 of series 2. In 2004, the remaining 13 episodes were dubbed by Fabulous Films Ltd using the original voice acting cast, following a successful release of the English-dubbed series on VHS and DVD; later, these newly dubbed episodes were broadcast by Channel 4 in the UK.

A Spanish-dubbed version of Monkey aired in Mexico, Costa Rica, Peru, Argentina, Uruguay and the Dominican Republic in the early 1980s. While the BBC-dubbed Monkey never received a broadcast in the United States, the original Japanese-language version, Saiyūki, was shown on local Japanese-language television stations in California and Hawaii in the early 1980s.

Episode list 

 Monkey Goes Wild About Heaven
 Monkey Turns Nursemaid
 The Great Journey Begins
 Monkey Swallows the Universe 
 The Power of Youth 
 Even Monsters Can Be People 
 The Beginning of Wisdom 
 Pigsy Woos A Widow 
 What Monkey Calls The Dog-Woman
 Pigsy's in The Well
 The Difference Between Night And Day
 Pearls Before Swine
 The Minx and the Slug
 Catfish, Saint and the Shape-Changer
 Monkey Meets The Demon Digger
 The Most Monstrous Monster
 Truth and the Grey Gloves Devil
 Land for the Locusts
 Vampire Master
 Outrageous Coincidences
 Pigsy, King and God
 Village of the Undead
 Two Little Blessings
 The Fires of Jealousy
 The Country of Nightmares
 The End of The Way
 Pigsy's Ten Thousand Ladies
 The Dogs of Death
 The Foolish Philosopher
 Who Am I?
 What is Wisdom?
 The Fountain of Youth
 A Shadow So Huge
 Keep on Dancing
 Give and Take
 Such A Nice Monster
 Pretty As a Picture
 Mothers
 At the Top of The Mountain

The second half of series 2 was not originally dubbed into English. This was done in 2004 with as much of the original cast as possible. The translation and voicing of the subsequent English voice dub is less erudite and humorous than the original effort; and includes some swear words that feel out of place in the context of the original. The voice of Pigsy is slurred in parts - perhaps reflecting the age and health of the voice actor decades later.

Soundtrack 
The songs in the series were performed by the five-piece Japanese band Godiego. In Japan, the first series' ending theme , which was named after the ancient kingdom of Gandhara, was released by Columbia Music Entertainment on 1 October 1978, backed with "Celebration". This was followed by the release of the opening theme "Monkey Magic" on 25 December 1978, with "A Fool" on the B-side. Godiego also released the soundtrack album Magic Monkey on 25 October 1978, comprising all of the songs that the band had composed for the first series.

The album became one of the group's highest-charting releases, staying at #1 on the Oricon chart for a total of eight weeks from January through March 1979 (it was unseated for most of January by the Japanese release of Grease: The Original Soundtrack from the Motion Picture), and it was ultimately the #1 LP for 1979. For the second series, the ending theme of "Gandhara" was replaced with "Holy and Bright", which was released on 1 October 1979 (the two sides of the single featured a Japanese-language version on one side and an English-language version on the other).

In the UK, BBC Records released "Gandhara" as a single in 1979 (RESL 66), with "The Birth of the Odyssey" and "Monkey Magic" on the B-side. The single reached #56 on the UK Singles Chart, eventually spending a total of seven weeks on the chart. A second BBC single was released in 1980 (RESL 81), this time featuring an edited version of "Monkey Magic", along with "Gandhara" and "Thank You Baby", but this single failed to chart. The BBC releases of "Gandhara" have one verse sung in Japanese and the other in English. BBC Records also released the Magic Monkey album under the simplified title of Monkey (REB 384) in 1980 but it failed to chart.

Legacy
Monkey is considered a cult classic in countries where it has been shown, reaching as far as South America. Among the features that have contributed to its cult appeal are the theme song, the dubbed dialogue spoken in a variety of over-the-top "oriental" accents, the reasonably good synchronization of dubbing to the actors' original dialogue, the memorable battles which were for many Western youngsters their first exposure to Asian-style fantasy action sequences, and the fact that the young priest Tripitaka was played by a woman, despite being male.

In 1981, the Australian Broadcasting Corporation debuted the BBC-dubbed Monkey at 6pm on week-nights. Since then, the show has been frequently repeated on the ABC, notably during the contemporary youth TV show Recovery which aired episodes of Monkey weekly from 1996 to 2000. When Recovery was put on hiatus, it was replaced with three hours of Monkey. The radio station Triple J often made references to Monkey and interviewed the original BBC voice actors on several occasions.

The British folk pop band Monkey Swallows the Universe took their name from an episode of Monkey.

See also

 List of media adaptations of Journey to the West
 Monkey (novel)
 The New Legends of Monkey (2018 TV series reboot)

References

External links
 Monkey – Great Sage equal of Heaven –  fansite Includes synopses of 52 episodes, and descriptions of the characters, demons, and gods.
 Monkey Heaven – fansite Includes short synopses and detailed summaries of 52 episodes, airdates, and more.
 Monkey at the Internet Movie Database (IMDb)
 What was Monkey Magic all about? – BBC News article assessing the show's lasting popularity

1978 Japanese television series debuts
1980 Japanese television series endings
1978 British television series debuts
1980 British television series endings
BBC Television shows
Television shows based on Journey to the West
Tsuburaya Productions
Nippon TV dramas
Japanese action television series
Japanese comedy television series
Japanese fantasy television series
Television shows written by James Miki
Television series set in Ancient India